Rome, Ohio is a village in Adams County.

Rome, Ohio may also refer to:

Rome, Ashtabula County, Ohio, an unincorporated community
Rome, Delaware County, Ohio, an unincorporated community
Rome, Morrow County, Ohio, a ghost town
Rome, Richland County, Ohio, an unincorporated community

See also
New Rome, Ohio
Rome Township, Ohio (disambiguation)